The 1984–85 South Pacific cyclone season was an above-average tropical cyclone season, with nine tropical cyclones occurring within the basin between 160°E and 120°W. The season ran from November 1, 1984, to April 30, 1985, with tropical cyclones officially monitored by the Fiji Meteorological Service (FMS), Australian Bureau of Meteorology (BoM) and New Zealand's MetService. The United States Joint Typhoon Warning Center (JTWC) and other national meteorological services including Météo-France and NOAA also monitored the basin during the season. During the season there was nine tropical cyclones occurring within the basin, including three that moved into the basin from the Australian region. The BoM, MetService and RSMC Nadi all estimated sustained wind speeds over a period of 10-minutes, which are subsequently compared to the Australian tropical cyclone intensity scale, while the JTWC estimated sustained winds over a 1-minute period, which are subsequently compared to the Saffir–Simpson hurricane wind scale (SSHWS).


Seasonal summary 

During November and December no significant tropical cyclones developed in or moved into the basin in the region,

The remnants of Tropical Cyclone Pierre were last noted during 24 February, as they moved into the basin from the Australian region.

Systems

Unnamed Tropical Cyclone 

An unnamed tropical cyclone existed from December 26 to December 28.

Tropical Cyclone Monica 

Tropical Cyclone Monica existed from December 29 to December 30.

Tropical Cyclone Drena 

Tropical Cyclone Drena existed from January 9 to January 16.

Severe Tropical Cyclone Eric 

Over the next day the system moved eastwards and developed further as gale-force winds developed near the systems centre before the JTWC initiated advisories on the system and designated it as Tropical Cyclone 11P during January 14. The system was subsequently named Eric by TCWC Nadi as it moved closer to Espiritu Santo and became equivalent to a category 1 tropical cyclone. During January 15, Eric passed near or over Espiritu Santo, as it continued to intensify before it turned and accelerated south-eastwards. Eric subsequently became equivalent to a category 3 severe tropical cyclone early the next day, before an Air Pacific flight from Fiji to the Solomon Islands located the systems eye on radar.

During January 17, Eric's well defined eye came into the range of Nadi airports surveillance radar, before TCWC Nadi estimated that Eric had peaked with 10-minute sustained wind-speeds of 150 km/h (90 mph). After the system had made landfall, the JTWC estimated that Eric had peaked with 1-minute sustained wind speeds of 185 km/h (115 mph), which made it equivalent to a category 3 hurricane on the SSHWS. The system subsequently passed near or over Fiji's capital: Suva before emerging into the Korro Sea and weakening.

Severe Tropical Cyclone Nigel 

Late on January 16, Tropical Cyclone Nigel moved into the South Pacific basin from the Australian region. During the next day the system continued to move eastwards and developed an eye, before it became equivalent to a modern-day category 3 severe tropical cyclone.

Severe Tropical Cyclone Odette 

At around 1300 UTC on January 19, Severe Tropical Cyclone Odette moved into the South Pacific Basin from the Australian Region.

Severe Tropical Cyclone Freda 

Tropical Cyclone Gavin 

Gavin caused widespread flooding within the western division of Fiji, with seven people killed as a result.

Severe Tropical Cyclone Hina 

 	
Hina was one of the most intense tropical cyclones ever recorded in the South Pacific basin. Having a distinct rainband and well defined outflow with low wind shear and warm water temperature, Hina underwent a period of Explosive Deepening (rapid intensification) The storm continued southward. Due to unfavorable conditions and an approaching Eyewall Replacement Cycle, the storm weakened into a tropical storm. As its center became ill-defined, the storm lost winds of tropical storm force and weakened into a tropical depression. The remnants dissipated some time later.

Season effects 
This table lists all the storms that developed in the South Pacific basin during the 1984–85 season. It includes their intensity on the Australian Tropical cyclone intensity scale, duration, name, areas affected, deaths, and damages.

|-
|  ||  || bgcolor=#| || bgcolor=#| || bgcolor=#| || ||  ||  ||
|-
|  ||  || bgcolor=#| || bgcolor=#| || bgcolor=#| || New Caledonia ||  ||  ||
|-
|  ||  || bgcolor=#| || bgcolor=#| || bgcolor=#| || || || ||
|-
|  ||  || bgcolor=#| || bgcolor=#| || bgcolor=#| || Vanuatu, Fiji, Tonga || rowspan=2| || rowspan=2| ||rowspan=2|
|-
|  ||  || bgcolor=#| || bgcolor=#| || bgcolor=#| || Vanuatu, Fiji, Tonga
|-
|  ||  || bgcolor=#| || bgcolor=#| || bgcolor=#| || Vanuatu || Minor ||  ||
|-
|  ||  || bgcolor=#| || bgcolor=#| || bgcolor=#| || || || ||
|-
|  ||  || bgcolor=#| || bgcolor=#| || bgcolor=#| || Vanuatu, Fiji || || 7 ||
|-
|  ||  || bgcolor=#| || bgcolor=#| || bgcolor=#| || Solomon Islands, Vanuatu, Fiji || || 3 ||
|-

References

External links 

 
South Pacific cyclone seasons
Tropical cyclones in 1984
Tropical cyclones in 1985